The Franco-German Parliamentary Assembly (DFPV) is a joint body of the German Bundestag and the French National Assembly formed to enable cooperation between both houses.

Background 

The French and German parliaments had previously held a joint session on occasion of the 40th anniversary of the Élysée Treaty, a key document for France–Germany relations after World War II, in January 2003.

First steps for an inter-parliamentary organisation were laid with regular meetings of parliament committees during 2018. This led to the Aachen Treaty, signed by Angela Merkel and Emmanuel Macron on 22 January 2019.

The assembly's first session was held on 25 March 2019 in Paris after the agreement was signed by Wolfgang Schäuble and Richard Ferrand, each parliament's president.

Purpose 

The parliamentary assembly does not have the capacity to make binding resolutions or legislation, nor any budgetary authority. Its goal is to discuss matters of French-German cooperation, such as the ratification of the Aachen Treaty, cross-border development projects, and the implementation of EU Directives. Other topics for discussion include foreign, defence and security policy.

Sessions are held twice per year, alternating between Paris and Berlin.

Membership 

The joint assembly is composed of 100 members, 50 sent by each parliament. The President of the Bundestag and President of the National Assembly are its chairpersons. An administrative bureau led by Sabine Thillaye (France) and Andreas Jung (Germany) was formed.

See also 
 Franco-German Ministerial Council

References

External links 
 On the Bundestag website: 
 On the Assemblée nationale website: 
 French-German Parliamentary Agreement: in German and in French

France–Germany relations
Parliamentary assemblies
Politics of Europe
National Assembly (France)
Bundestag